Al Ghaydah Airport  is an airport near Al Ghaydah, Yemen.

History
In December 2017, Saudi Arabia began stationing troops at Al-Ghaydah International Airport, as part of the Saudi Arabian-led intervention in Yemen. Following months of protests, Saudi forces returned control of the airport to Yemeni officials in July 2018.

References

Airports in Yemen
Al Mahrah Governorate